Captain Volkonogov Escaped (translit. Kapitan Volkonogov bezhal) is a 2021 Russian thriller drama film written and directed by Natalya Merkulova and Aleksey Chupov. The main roles were played by Yuri Borisov   as Captain Fyodor Volkonogov. It was selected to compete for the Golden Lion at the 78th Venice International Film Festival.

Plot
The setting is the USSR during the Great Terror. Captain Fyodor Volkonogov serves in the Soviet law enforcement agency. He is trusted by his superiors and his colleagues respect him. However, one day his life takes an unexpected turn: he is accused of being a criminal. The Captain manages to run away before he is arrested; in one hour he witnesses how his reputation has been destroyed and how his former colleagues and friends are out for his blood. 
Then, a messenger from the world above appears to the Captain and informs him that after his death, he is destined for hell. He has one last chance to change his fate, if he would repent, and can find just one victim that would forgive him his crimes.

Cast
 Yuri Borisov as Captain Volkonogov
 Timofey Tribuntsev as Major Golovnya
 Aleksandr Yatsenko as Major Gvozdyov
 Nikita Kukushkin as Veretennikov
 Vladimir Epifantsev as Colonel Zhikharev
 Anastasiya Ukolova as Raisa
 Natalya Kudriashova as Elizarova
 Dmitry Podnozov as Professor Elizarov
 Viktoriya Tolstoganova as the widow Steiner
 Yury Kuznetsov as Ignatiy Alekseyevich
 Igor Savochkin as Uncle Misha
 Maxim Stoyanov as the worker Lependyin

This film was Igor Savochkin's final role before his death.

Production 
The film received support from the Ministry of Culture of the Russian Federation, the Kinoprime Foundation for the Development of Contemporary Cinematography, the European Fund for Supporting Co-production and Distribution of Cinematographic and Audiovisual Works Eurimages, the Estonian Ministry of Culture and the Estonian Film Foundation.

Production was carried out by the film companies Place of Power and Look-Film (Russia), Homeless Bob Production (Estonia), KinoVista (France). The producers were Valery Fedorovich, Yevgeny Nikishov, Aleksandr Plotnikov, co-producers   Catherine Kissa, Charles-Evrard Chekhov and Nadezhda Zayonchkovskaya.

Release
The first screening of the film took place on September 8, 2021 at the 78th Venice Film Festival. The picture claimed the main prize of the Golden Lion.

The film received the Audience Choice Award at the 32nd Kinotavr Open Film Festival (2021), the work entered the main competition and won in the Best Screenplay nomination.
The film won the bronze medal in the main competition at the El Gouna Festival, Egypt, and also won the Best Feature Film award at the XXX Philadelphia International Film Festival, becoming the first Russian film in history to be awarded this prize.

Captain Volkonogov Escaped is scheduled to be theatrically released in the Russian Federation in 2022 by Central Partnership.

Reception

Accolades
Within the framework of the Spanish International Film Festival in Gijon, Natalya Merkulova was awarded the prize as "Best Female Director".
2021 Golden Unicorn Awards: "Best Film", "Best Screenplay" and "Best Actor" (Yuri Borisov)
 White Elephant Awards of the Russian Guild of Film Critics and Critics in the Best Film nominations, "Best Leading Actor" (Yuri Borisov) and "Best Supporting Actress" (Natalya Kudriashova).

Critical response
The Guardian writer Xan Brooks believes, "Chupov and Merkulova’s handling of the material is almost playful, choosing to frame Stalin’s Russia as nightmarish deadpan comedy."

Vasily Stepanov, chief editor of Seans, said of the film: "According to the plot, Volkonogov is a kind of parable: a dead comrade appears to the fleeing hero, who promises him an obligatory place in hell if the captain does not beg forgiveness from at least one victim. The scene of the appearance of the infernal messenger from the common grave is made festively, as in Masodov's prose. But with apologies, and even more so with repentance, Volkonogov is tight."

References

External links
 

2021 films
2021 thriller drama films
2020s Russian-language films
Russian thriller drama films
2021 thriller films
Films directed by Natalya Merkulova
Films about Soviet repression